Airmanship is skill and knowledge applied to aerial navigation, similar to seamanship in maritime navigation. Airmanship covers a broad range of desirable behaviors and abilities in an aviator. It is not simply a measure of skill or technique, but also a measure of a pilot’s awareness of the aircraft, the environment in which it operates, and of his\her own capabilities.

Airmanship is defined by the US FAA as:
A sound acquaintance with the principles of flight,
The ability to operate an airplane with competence and precision both on the ground and in the air, and 
The exercise of sound judgment that results in optimal operational safety and efficiency.

The United Kingdom Civil Aviation Authority describes airmanship as "a somewhat controversial and vague expression intended to convey a measure of understanding; experience; or, more succinctly, aviation 'common-sense'. What can be said is that 'Airmanship' is something gained from exposure to the experiences and sage advice of other aviators; properly thinking about and 
understanding the application of rules, procedures and airspace; and a healthy dose of self-preservation."

A review paper presented at a NATO research and training symposium on military aviation human factors defined airmanship as "a personal state that enables aircrew to exercise sound judgment, display uncompromising flight discipline and demonstrate skillful control of an aircraft and a situation. It is maintained by continuous self-improvement and a desire to perform optimally at all times." Combining modern academic and industry definitions, it's accepted now that airmanship is a multi-dimensional concept involving skilful control of an aircraft, making good decisions about the flight, and is tightly linked to flight discipline.

The three fundamental principles of expert airmanship are skill, proficiency, and the discipline to apply them in a safe and efficient manner.
Discipline is the foundation of airmanship.
The complexity of the aviation environment demands a foundation of solid airmanship, and a healthy, positive approach to combating pilot error.

The actions of Captain Alfred C. Haynes and the crew of United Airlines Flight 232 are often cited as an exemplar of good airmanship. They were able to maintain control of their crippled McDonnell Douglas DC-10, bringing it to a survivable "controlled crash" in Sioux City, Iowa, after a complete loss of all flight controls following an engine failure in July 1989. They did this by improvising a control scheme on the spot using differential engine thrust on the two working engines. Captain Haynes credited his Crew Resource Management training as one of the key factors that saved his own life, and many others.

The U.S. National Transportation Safety Board occasionally cites poor airmanship as a contributing factor in its determination of probable cause in aviation accidents, although it is implicit in many of the pilot error causes it often uses. For example, in its report on the December 1, 1993, fatal crash of Northwest Airlink Flight 5719, the NTSB determined the "failure of the company management to adequately address the previously identified deficiencies in airmanship" was a contributing factor.
In a February 2, 2005 business jet accident at Teterboro Airport, NTSB investigator Steve Demko, speaking about the probable cause, said determining an aircraft's weight and balance before takeoff is "basic airmanship," a "Flying 101 type of thing."
In a 2006 New York City plane crash that killed New York Yankees pitcher Cory Lidle, the NTSB cited "inadequate judgement, planning and airmanship" in its probable cause determination.

The UK CAA cites "poor airmanship" as a factor in many airprox events.

A "failure of airmanship" was also cited by Maurice Baril, investigating the Tarnak Farm incident in Afghanistan, where the pilot of a U.S. F-16 Fighting Falcon mistakenly targeted a  laser-guided bomb on training Canadian troops in April 2003, killing four of them. Airmanship covers operation of the aircraft and all its systems, so in military usage, this includes the weapons systems of combat aircraft.

References

Aircraft operations
Aviation safety